The 1983–84 Kent Football League season was the 18th in the history of the Kent Football League, a football competition in England. This season saw the league introduce three points for a win system.

The league was won by Sittingbourne, while Sheppey United was promoted to the Southern Football League.

League table

The league featured 16 clubs which competed in the previous season, no new clubs joined the league this season.

League table

References

External links

1983-84
1983–84 in English football leagues